Spent mushroom compost is the residual compost waste generated by the mushroom production industry.

Background
It is readily available (bagged, at nursery suppliers), and its formulation generally consists of a combination of wheat straw, dried blood, horse manure and ground chalk, composted together. It is an excellent source of humus, although much of its nitrogen content will have been used up by the composting and growing mushrooms. It remains, however, a good source of general nutrients (0.7% N, 0.3% P, 0.3% K plus a full range of trace elements), as well as a useful soil conditioner. However, due to its chalk content, it may be alkaline, and should not be used on acid-loving plants, nor should it be applied too frequently, as it will overly raise the soil's pH levels.

Mushroom compost may also contain pesticide residues, particularly organochlorides used against the fungus gnat. If the compost pile was stored outside, it may contain grubs or other insects attracted to decaying matter. Chemicals may also have been used to treat the straw, and also to sterilize the compost. Therefore, the organic gardener must be careful regarding the sourcing of mushroom compost; if in doubt, samples can be analyzed for contamination – in the UK, the Department for Environment, Food and Rural Affairs is able to advise regarding this issue.

Commercially available 'spent' mushroom compost is not always truly spent. It is sold by mushroom farms when it is no longer producing commercially viable yields of mushrooms. It can be used to grow further smaller crops of mushrooms before final use on the garden.

References

Soil improvers
Composting
Organic gardening
Permaculture
Sustainable gardening